Inspirations is a 1997 documentary directed by Michael Apted.

Synopsis
The film explores creativity in the arts through interviews with several prominent figures known for a variety of artistic media:
Musician David Bowie.
Pop artist Roy Lichtenstein.
Glass sculptor Dale Chihuly.
Dance choreographer Édouard Lock.
Dancer Louise LeCavalier.
Potter/poet Nora Naranjo-Morse.
Architect Tadao Ando.

External links

1997 films
Documentary films about the arts
1990s English-language films
American documentary films
1990s American films